Bulfinch Crossing (also known as the Government Center Garage Redevelopment) is a redevelopment project currently under construction in Downtown Boston, Massachusetts, United States. It will consist of two skyscrapers, a smaller residential tower, a low-rise office building, a hotel, and a low-rise retail building. Site preparation began in late 2015, and construction officially commenced on January 24, 2017. Construction on the residential tower completed in 2020. The high-rise office tower, One Congress, commenced construction in 2019 and topped off in July 2021; it is planned to open in 2022.

One Congress

The primary building of the development is the 43-story office tower, which will feature a three-story lobby and high-end amenities. The first four floors of the building will contain the lobby and a restaurant, with each floor containing 23,200 square feet. Floors five through ten will contain offices and parking, and each floor will contain 8,800 square feet. The remaining floors will contain offices, and each floor will contain 27,500 square feet. The building is planned to earn a gold level of certification through the US Green Building Council's Leadership in Energy and Environmental Design certification program.

Some preliminary construction on the building is underway, but no major construction will begin until an anchor tenant is found. As in summer of 2018, developers of One Congress & Bulfinch Crossing have announced on Bulfinch Crossing's Twitter that construction will finally start One Congress in summer of 2019 and also announced that it will be opening in 2022. In January 2019, State Street Corporation was announced to be the primary tenant in the new building.

The building will contain a fitness center, basketball court, rooftop garden, and several conference rooms. On-site parking is also available.

Residential tower

The tower was originally planned to consist of 486 apartments, but will now instead contain only 368 apartments and 55 condos. This change was announced in July 2017 when the developer decided to convert 118 apartments into 55 condos due to a slowing demand for luxury housing in Boston.

The residential tower will contain a fitness center, swimming pool, rooftop garden, clubroom, private kitchen and diner, yoga room, golf simulator, pet spa, concierge services and a sky lounge and terrace. On-site parking is also available.

Other buildings
Along with the two main towers of the development, four smaller buildings and a public square will be constructed.

Residential Tower II
A smaller residential tower (officially named Residential Tower II), is being constructed alongside the rest of the development. It is planned to rise at least  and contain 28 stories. The tower is planned to be primarily residential, with 291 units. At least  of the building will be designated for retail use.

Boutique Office
In addition to the main office tower, a smaller office building (officially named Boutique Office) is under construction; it is planned to contain at least  of both office and retail space. The building will rise  and will contain 11 stories. It is planned to have a private terrace for office workers.

Retail building
A retail building (officially named Iconic Retail) is planned to be constructed as part of the development project; it is planned to be situated across the street from the Boston Public Market and will contain four floors. The building is intended to house a flagship store, and will include an entrance to the Haymarket Square subway station.

Hotel

Amenities
The hotel is planned to contain a ballroom, several meeting rooms, a rooftop bar, and a rooftop terrace.

Parking garage

In order to make room for the new development, the existing Government Center garage will be demolished. The garage was constructed in the 1960s as part of the Government Center urban renewal project; it contains 2,300 parking spaces. Due to the fact that the garage is entirely made out of concrete, it is considered to be an eyesore by many, along with the nearby City Hall building.

At least 1,160 parking spaces in the garage are to be preserved to accommodate the new development, the spaces are planned to be placed inside of the new office tower.

External links 
 Official website

References 

Redevelopment projects in the United States
Urban renewal
Government Center, Boston
Projects established in 2013